Johnny Scott may refer to:

Johnny Scott (Canadian football) (born 1969), defensive lineman in the Canadian Football League
Johnny Scott (jazz musician), jazz vocalist and tenor saxophonist
John Scott (composer) (born 1940), British composer (of inter alia the theme music to Nationwide) and conductor
Johnny Scott (musician), guitarist, vocalist and arranger, best known for his work with Van Morrison
Sir John Scott, 5th Baronet, natural historian, broadcaster, columnist, countryside campaigner and farmer

See also
John Scott (disambiguation)